Friedrich August von Staegemann (7 November 1763 in Vierraden (Uckermark) - 17 December 1840 in Berlin) was a Prussian politician and diplomat.

In September 1796, he married Elisabeth von Staegemann.

1763 births
1840 deaths
German untitled nobility
Prussian politicians
S